Maxwellia lepidota is a species of shrubs or trees in the family Malvaceae. It is endemic to New Caledonia and the only species of the monotypic genus Maxwellia. Its closest relatives are all Australian genera in tribe Lasiopetaleae: Guichenotia, Hannafordia, Lysiosepalum, Lasiopetalum and Thomasia.

The genus name of Maxwellia is in honour of Maxwell T. Masters (1833–1907), an English botanist and taxonomist. The Latin specific epithet of lepidota refers to the Greek word ''lepidotus' meaning scaly.
Both genus and species were first described and published in Adansonia Vol.10 on page 100 in 1871.

References

Byttnerioideae
Plants described in 1845
Endemic flora of New Caledonia
Taxa named by Henri Ernest Baillon